Jones Creek may refer to:

Jones Creek (Big River), a stream in Missouri
Jones Creek (Center Creek), a stream in Missouri
Jones Creek (Gasconade River), a stream in Missouri
Jones Creek (Mohawk River), a stream in New York
Jones Creek (Pee Dee River tributary), a stream in Anson County, North Carolina
Jones Creek (South Dakota), a stream in South Dakota
Jones Creek, Texas, a village in Texas
the Song Canh Hom river in Quảng Trị province, Vietnam, nicknamed Jones Creek by United States forces during the Vietnam War

See also
Jones Branch (disambiguation)